Elisa Maria Eugenia Cibrario Cinquini (6 September 1905 – 16 May 1992) was an Italian mathematician specializing in partial differential equations and known for her research in association with Guido Fubini, Giuseppe Peano, and Francesco Tricomi.

Life

Early life and education
Maria Cibrario was born in Genoa on 6 September 1905. She became an assistant to Giuseppe Peano, and Peano assisted her in earning a habilitation as a secondary-school teacher in 1927. Peano died in 1932, and in the same year she obtained a free lecturership and began working with Francesco Tricomi.

Later life and academic career
In 1938, she married mathematician ; they had three children. Soon after marrying, they both took faculty positions at the University of Pavia. In 1947 she won the competition for the chair in mathematical analysis at the University of Cagliari, from which she moved to the University of Modena and then, in 1950, returned to Pavia as a full professor. She retired as professor emerita in 1980.

She died on 16 May 1992, in Pavia.

Research
Cibrario's 1927 thesis concerned Laplace transforms and their application to parabolic partial differential equations. From then until the early 1940s, one of her main areas of study concerned partial differential equations of mixed elliptic–hyperbolic type, finding earlier work of Tricomi in this area to be incomplete and publishing a complete classification of these equations and of the solution methods suitable for each type of equation within this classification. This work later had great applicability to the aerodynamics of transonic aircraft, and the Cibrario–Cinquini equation is named for her work from this time.

Her later work concerned non-linear differential equations, systems of hyperbolic equations, and the theory of curves and generalized functions. It included the solution of old problems of Édouard Goursat on non-linear hyperbolic equations and of Augustin-Louis Cauchy on systems of first-order equations.

Recognition
In 1929, Cibrario won the Corrado Segre prize for her early research, and in 1933, Cibrario won a prize for junior researchers from the Accademia dei Lincei. She joined the Istituto Lombardo Accademia di Scienze e Lettere in 1951 and became a full member in 1967. After her retirement, in 1981, she was elected as a corresponding member of the Accademia dei Lincei.

References

Further reading

External links

1905 births
1992 deaths
Italian mathematicians
Italian women mathematicians
University of Turin alumni
Academic staff of the University of Pavia
Academic staff of the University of Cagliari
Academic staff of the University of Modena and Reggio Emilia